Jill Goldthwait is an American politician from Maine. Goldthwait grew up in New Jersey and obtained a degree in nursing in California. She served a stint as a Peace Corps volunteer in Tonga. She moved to Maine in 1978 and settled in Bar Harbor, Maine on Mount Desert Island. She worked as an emergency department nurse at Mount Desert Island Hospital and served on the Bar Harbor Town Council for 9 years prior to running for Maine State Senate. An unenrolled (independent), she won 4 terms (1994-2002) in the State Senate before being unable to run for re-election due to term-limits. She then took a job with Jackson Laboratory in Bar Harbor, which later turned into a permanent position as Director of Government Relations. In 2005, Goldthwait was named by Governor John Baldacci to the state's newly created Creative Economy Council.

References

Year of birth missing (living people)
Living people
American nurses
American women nurses
Maine Independents
People from New Jersey
People from Bar Harbor, Maine
Maine city council members
Maine state senators
Women state legislators in Maine
Peace Corps volunteers
Women city councillors in Maine
21st-century American women